Patrick Martin Conroy (born 10 May 1979) is an Australian politician. He is a member of the Australian Labor Party (ALP) and the Labor Left faction and has been a member of the House of Representatives since 2013. He represented the Division of Charlton in New South Wales until its abolition in 2016, and since then has represented the Division of Shortland. He is currently the Minister for Defence Industry and Minister for International Development and the Pacific.

Early life
Conroy was born in Sydney, however he moved to the Central Coast of New South Wales when he was one year old. His parents were "union delegates throughout their lives and long-time Labor activists". He was born a British citizen by descent through his father, who was born in Bishop Auckland, County Durham, England. He renounced his dual citizenship before standing at the 2013 election in accordance with section 44 of the constitution.

Conroy attended Ettalong Public School and Gosford High School. Growing up he played for the Woy Woy Football Club and the Gosford Rugby Club. Conroy holds the degree of Bachelor of Economics (Hons.) from the University of Sydney. He joined the ALP in 1994 and served as a state and federal vice-president of Australian Young Labor from 2003 to 2004. Prior to entering parliament, he worked as an electorate officer for Anthony Albanese (2000), an industrial/policy officer with the CFMEU's forestry division (2000–2002), a policy adviser to George Campbell (2002–2004), national economist to the Australian Manufacturing Workers' Union (2004–2008), and as principal policy adviser (2008–2011) and deputy chief of staff (2011–2013) to Greg Combet.

Parliament
Conroy was elected to parliament at the 2013 federal election, retaining the Division of Charlton for the Labor Party following Greg Combet's retirement. He transferred to the Division of Shortland at the 2016 election, following Charlton's abolition. After the election he was appointed to Bill Shorten's shadow ministry as an assistant minister for the portfolios of infrastructure and climate change and energy. He retained his place in Anthony Albanese's shadow ministry after the 2019 election, and was promoted to Shadow Minister for International Development and the Pacific as well as minister assisting in the portfolios of climate change, defence and government accountability.

Conroy is aligned with the ALP's Socialist Left faction,  and serves as one of the two federal parliamentary convenors of the Labor Left faction, along with Andrew Giles.

References

External links
 
 Profile at TheyVoteForYou.org.au
 

1979 births
Living people
Australian Labor Party members of the Parliament of Australia
Members of the Australian House of Representatives for Charlton
Members of the Australian House of Representatives for Shortland
Members of the Australian House of Representatives
Australian economists
University of Sydney alumni
Labor Left politicians
21st-century Australian politicians
Australian people of English descent
People who lost British citizenship
Citizens of the United Kingdom through descent